Bishandot is a village in Kallar Syedan Tehsil, Rawalpindi District, Punjab, Pakistan. It is 5 km southeast of the town of Rawat and 20 km southeast of the city of Rawalpindi. 

GPS Bishandot is the local Government Primary School for girls in Bishandot.

References

Villages in Kallar Syedan Tehsil
Populated places in Kallar Syedan Tehsil